October Language is an album by the New Orleans-based duo Belong, released on 8 February 2006 by Carpark Records. It has since been re-released on vinyl by the labels Geographic North in 2009, and Spectrum Spools (an Editions Mego imprint) in 2018 and 2022.

Production
The album was written, recorded, and produced in 2004 in Dietrich's home studio in New Orleans. Guitars provided by Joshua Eustis were recorded in his own studio. Multiple different guitars such as the Parker Fly Deluxe and the Gibson Blueshawk, and a wide array of synths, such as the Sequential Prophet-5, the Roland Juno-106, and the Nord Micro Modular, were used in the album's production. These guitars and synths were then run through many different effect modules like the Sherman Filterbanks, the Roland RE-201, and the Frostwave Resonator, and then into the DAW Pro Tools where further VST effects were applied. Native Instruments' Reaktor and Kontakt were also used in the production of the album.

Dietrich emphasized the role that headphones, specifically the Grado SR-325s, played in the album's production: "...in the studio, headphones are always used. In addition to studio monitors, we use headphones through the recording, the editing, the programming, all the way through to the final mix."

Track listing

Personnel
 Turk Dietrich – production and mastering
 Michael Jones – production
 Joshua Eustis – mastering, guitar on track 3, assistance on tracks 2 and 4

References

External links
 MySpace Music page

2006 albums
Belong (band) albums